The Chattenden and Upnor Railway (also known as the Lodge Hill and Upnor Railway) was a narrow gauge railway serving the military barracks and depot at Upnor, Kent and associated munitions and training depots. It was preceded in the early 1870s by a temporary standard-gauge railway. The  narrow gauge was built in 1885, and continued in use until the end of 1961.

History

Precursors 
The first railway at Chattenden was a standard gauge line laid by the Royal Engineers in the early 1870s. This was used to bring building materials from a wharf at Upnor to be used in the construction of the Chattenden Munitions Depot. According to a report in the issue of "Iron" dated Saturday 29 May 1875: "A detachment of non-commissioned officers and men of the Royal Engineers, commanded by Lieutenant Barker, on Saturday left the School of Military Engineering at Chatham for Upnor, where they will be quartered for some time, as they are to be employed to lay down lines of rails to connect forts on the Thames and Medway with the new powder magazines to be constructed at Chattenden Roughs, a few miles from the old magazines at Upnor Castle. It is expected that more than forty miles of these railways will be constructed." This railway fell out of use when the building work was completed.

A  railway was laid to help with the construction of the standard gauge line. An  locomotive, called Burgoyne, built by Manning Wardle in 1873, was used in construction.

Opening 
In 1885, members of the Royal School of Military Engineering laid an experimental  gauge railway on the trackbed of the standard gauge line. The steep gradients involved allowed the engineers to test the effectiveness of narrow-gauge railways over hilly terrain. At the time  gauge railways were being used extensively in the North-West Frontier Province of India.

World Wars 
The Chattenden and Upnor Railway line was taken over by the Admiralty on 1 April 1906. Two new locomotives, Fisher and Chevalier were purchased just after the start of the First World War to deal with the rise in munitions traffic. In 1918, five Greenwood and Batley battery-electric locomotives were purchased, to work the lines into the munitions stores where steam locomotives were a fire risk.

In 1931 the railway had 91 powder wagons, 16 box wagons to carry ammunition, 17 assorted wagons for ballast, an officers‘ carriage, 7 workmen‘s carriages, 3 brake vans, and a breakdown van.

Two final steam locomotives, Burnett Hall and Norbury were purchased in 1933 and 1934. These were the main locomotives in use at the start of the Second World War. In 1943, the first of a series of diesel locomotives were purchased.

Closure 

By 1896, the last  of the Hoo branch had been lifted, with the remainder removed by 1909.

By 1941, the section of the branch from Upnor to the Tank Field signal box was mostly out of use, and the remaining section to Pontoon Hard (Upper Upnor) was closed. The rest of the line closed on 31 December 1961. The track was lifted in December 1965.

Passenger services 
The line was never opened to the public, but passenger services were run for munitions workers. In 1891 there were nine passenger trains running each day.

During the Second World War, passenger trains were revived using bogie carriages built by Charles Roberts & Co. Ltd. in 1942. These continued until 19 May 1961.

Route 

The railway started at the Lodge Hill munitions depot, at interchange sidings with the standard gauge Chattenden Naval Tramway. It curved around the west end of Chattenden Magazines Enclosure to Lutnor Junction, where a branch ran back into the magazines. A long branch ran east from here to the village of Hoo.

South of Chattenden Barracks, the line rose on an embankment to cross the A228 road on an overbridge. It then continued south to Upnor Junction, where two branches ran down to the bank of the River Medway. One branch ran west past Tank Field, to the Upper Pontoon Hard near Frindsbury. The other ran into the Upnor Depot.

The railway had several sections of steep gradients. From Upnor Depot to Church Crossing the line rose at 1 in 26, from there to Upnor Junction the gradient was 1 in 30. There was also a section of 1 in 34 approaching the west gate of Lodge Hill depot.

Accidents 
On 17 March 1907, Colonel Brabazon, the senior officer at Lodge Hill Depot, had a photograph taken of the 78 employees. The locomotive Lancashire hauled a special train to bring all the employees up to the depot. The driver was in the group, waiting for the photograph to be taken when the locomotive began to move. It ran away on the downhill gradient in the direction of Upnor and derailed on the curve around Issingham Barracks. The line only had a 5-ton jackscrew and a large crew spent most of the next day re-railing the locomotive.

Locomotives

Built for the Army

Built for the Admiralty

Battery-electric 
A large number of battery-electric locomotives were used, mainly to move munitions around the Lodge Hill depot. Six supplied in 1928 were also suitable for use on the main line. They had central cabs with large square-cornered windows and tramway skirts covering the wheels. These were replaced by six Greenwood and Batley 8-ton locomotives built between 1938 and 1945.

The rest of the battery-electric fleet were motorised wagons without cabs that were restricted to use in the depot. Twenty-four were supplied by Greenwood and Batley in batches between 1918 and 1948. Seven came from Wingrove & Rogers and two were built in the workshops at Lodge Hill.

Rolling Stock

See also
 British narrow gauge railways
 Industrial Railway Society

References

 
 

2 ft 6 in gauge railways in England
18 in gauge railways in England
Military railways in the United Kingdom
Rail transport in Kent
Transport in Medway